Flora Hill is a suburb located 3 km south-east of Bendigo, Victoria, Australia.  The suburb is home to Bendigo South East College and the La Trobe University Bendigo Campus.

References

Towns in Victoria (Australia)
Suburbs of Bendigo
Bendigo